Sidi Salem is a city in the Kafr El Sheikh Governorate, Egypt.

The medieval Arabic and Coptic scholars identified the city with ancient Phragonis, although the archeological findings point out to Kom al-Khawaled 7 kilometers east of Sidi Salem.

See also

 List of cities and towns in Egypt

References 

Populated places in Kafr El Sheikh Governorate
Cities in Egypt